Elkader  is a city in Clayton County, Iowa, United States. The population was 1,209 at the time of the 2020 census, down from 1,465 in 2000. It is the county seat of Clayton County. It is the site of Iowa's lowest recorded minimum temperature,  on February 3, 1996.

History
The city is named after a Muslim Algerian leader, Abd al-Qadir al-Jaza'iri. When the community was platted in 1846, the founders, Timothy Davis, John Thompson and Chester Sage decided to name it for the young Algerian who was leading his people in resisting the French conquest of Algeria.

The town is known for the Elkader Keystone Bridge over the Turkey River, said to be the largest stone arch bridge west of the Mississippi River. It, and many of the local buildings, are made from locally quarried sandstone. The town's grocery store, Wilke's, is the oldest continuously operated grocery store west of the Mississippi, as well. The city is also home to the renovated Victorian-era Elkader Opera House, and the Turkey River Mall, a 29-room hotel converted into antique stores.

The town featured in a WAMU World View documentary; "Couscous and cultural diplomacy", a documentary that focuses on an openly gay couple, one of whom is Algerian, who settled in Elkader and opened an Algerian-American restaurant. The documentary describes how the couple have largely been accepted as part of the community yet wrestle with cultural adaptation, American identity, and small town politics, as well as many of the personal issues they experienced post 9/11.

The city was one of many in Iowa affected by the Iowa Flood of 2008, with flood waters from the Turkey River reaching historic levels.

Geography

Demographics

2020 census
As of the census of 2020, the population was 1,209. The racial makeup of the city was 96.4% White, 0.5% Black or African American, 0.1% Native American, 0.1% Asian, 0.1% Pacific Islander, 0.7% from other races, and 2.2% from two or more races. Ethnically, the population was 2.2% Hispanic or Latino of any race.

2010 census
At the 2010 census there were 1,273 people, 577 households, and 342 families living in the city. The racial makeup of the city was 98.7% White, 0.1% African American, 0.3% Native American, 0.2% Asian, and 0.7% from two or more races. Hispanic or Latino of any race were 0.3%.

Of the 577 households 23.6% had children under the age of 18 living with them, 50.6% were married couples living together, 5.9% had a female householder with no husband present, 2.8% had a male householder with no wife present, and 40.7% were non-families. 35.7% of households were one person and 16.8% were one person aged 65 or older. The average household size was 2.10 and the average family size was 2.73.

The median age was 49.8 years. 18.9% of residents were under the age of 18; 5.5% were between the ages of 18 and 24; 19% were from 25 to 44; 32.4% were from 45 to 64; and 24.4% were 65 or older. The gender makeup of the city was 46.2% male and 53.8% female.

2000 census
At the 2000 census there were 1,465 people, 645 households, and 403 families living in the city. The racial makeup of the city was 99.25% White, 0.20% African American, 0.07% Native American, and 0.48% from two or more races. Hispanic or Latino of any race were 0.07%.

Of the 645 households 23.6% had children under the age of 18 living with them, 53.8% were married couples living together, 6.5% had a female householder with no husband present, and 37.4% were non-families. 35.0% of households were one person and 20.9% were one person aged 65 or older. The average household size was 2.16 and the average family size was 2.77.

20.6% are under the age of 18, 5.1% from 18 to 24, 23.5% from 25 to 44, 23.8% from 45 to 64, and 27.0% 65 or older. The median age was 45 years. For every 100 females, there were 80.4 males. For every 100 females age 18 and over, there were 77.6 males.

The median household income was $32,857 and the median family income  was $41,830. Males had a median income of $28,235 versus $19,550 for females. The per capita income for the city was $16,785. About 2.7% of families and 5.2% of the population were below the poverty line, including 4.3% of those under age 18 and 8.5% of those age 65 or over.

Education
The municipality is within the boundary of the Central Community School District.

Notable people

Timothy Davis, town founder and member of congress for Iowa
Jack Dittmer, Born in Elkader. Major League Baseball second baseman, The Boston/Milwaukee Braves (now Atlanta) and The Detroit Tigers.
Francis John Dunn, Roman Catholic bishop
Asle Gronna, U.S. Senator of North Dakota 1911-21
Donald Harstad, novelist
Leonard G. Wolf, U.S. Representative from Iowa
Heather Zichal, Former Deputy Assistant of Energy and Climate Change under Barack Obama

Sister city
Elkader has one sister city, as designated by Sister Cities International: 
  Mascara, Algeria

See also

Clayton County Courthouse
St. Joseph's Catholic Church (Elkader, Iowa)

Notes

References

External links

Explore Elkader Portal style website, Government, Business, Attractions and more
City-Data Comprehensive Statistical Data and more about Elkader

 
Cities in Iowa
Cities in Clayton County, Iowa
County seats in Iowa
1846 establishments in Iowa Territory
Populated places established in 1846